GC376 is a broad-spectrum antiviral medication under development by the biopharmaceutical company Anivive Lifesciences for therapeutic uses in humans and animals. Anivive licensed the exclusive worldwide patent rights to GC376 from Kansas State University. As of 2020, GC376 is being investigated as treatment for COVID-19. GC376 shows activity against many human and animal viruses including coronavirus and norovirus; the most extensive research has been multiple in vivo studies in cats treating a coronavirus which causes deadly feline infectious peritonitis. Other research supports use in porcine epidemic diarrhea virus.

COVID-19 

Since GC376 shows broad-spectrum activity against coronavirus, early on during the pandemic of 2020 it was suggested as a potential treatment for COVID-19. In response to the crisis, researchers at the University of Arizona published in vitro research indicating GC376 is highly active against 3CLpro in SARS-CoV-2 (the coronavirus which causes COVID-19). Another group of virologists at the University of Alberta lead by D. Lorne Tyrrell then released a separate publication confirming GC376's activity against 3CLpro in SARS-CoV-2 and also indicating GC376 had a potent antiviral effect. The next day, Columbia University's Zuckerman Institute hosted a COVID-19 Virtual Symposium which released research led by David Ho and characterized GC376 as "the most promising" protease inhibitor under investigation in Ho's lab because GC376 was the "most potent" and reached "complete viral inhibition" in a culture of cells infected with SARS-CoV-2.

Pharmacology

Pharmacodynamics 
GC376 is a protease inhibitor. It blocks the 3CLpro, a protease common to many (+)ssRNA viruses, thereby preventing the viral polyprotein from maturing into its functional parts. Chemically, GC376 is the bisulfite  adduct of an aldehyde GC373 and it behaves as a prodrug for that compound. This aldehyde forms a covalent bond with the cysteine-144 residue at the protease's active site, giving a monothioacetal and blocking the enzyme's normal function.

See also 

 3CLpro-1
 Carmofur
 Ebselen
 GRL-0617
 Rupintrivir
 Theaflavin digallate
 PF-07321332 (Pfizer)

References

External links 
 Anivive Pharmaceuticals

Antiviral drugs
SARS-CoV-2 main protease inhibitors